There are two species of skink named Aurora mountain skink, both found in the Philippines:

 Parvoscincus hadros
 Parvoscincus tagapayo